George's Dock was a dock in Liverpool, England.

George's Dock may also refer to:

 George's Dock, Dublin, Ireland

See also
 
 King George V Dock (disambiguation)